The Division Bell Tour was the final concert tour by the English rock band Pink Floyd.  It was performed in 1994 to support their album The Division Bell, which was released two days before the tour's start date. Following the tour's conclusion, the group quietly disbanded.

In 1995 the band released the live album Pulse to commemorate the tour.

History
The Division Bell Tour in 1994 was promoted by Canadian concert impresario Michael Cohl and became the highest-grossing tour in rock music history to that date, with the band playing the entirety of The Dark Side of the Moon in some shows. The first show they played the whole The Dark Side of the Moon was on 15 July 1994 at the Pontiac Silverdome in Pontiac, Michigan, which was the first time since 1975 it was played. While preparing for the tour, Pink Floyd spent most of March rehearsing in a hangar at Norton Air Force Base in California.

The concerts featured even more special effects than the previous tour, including two custom designed airships. All in all, the tour required 700 tons of steel carried by 53 articulated trucks, a crew of 161 people and an initial investment of US$4 million plus US$25 million of running costs just to stage. This tour played to 5.5 million people in 68 cities; each concert gathered an average audience of 45,000.

The shows are documented by the Pulse album, video and DVD. The final concert of the tour on 29 October 1994 turned out to be the final full-length Pink Floyd performance, and the last time Pink Floyd played live before their one-off 18-minute reunion with Roger Waters at Live 8 on 2 July 2005.

Sponsorship 
The tour was sponsored in Europe by Volkswagen, which also issued a commemorative version of its top-selling car, the "Golf Pink Floyd", one of which was given as a prize at each concert. It was a standard Golf with Pink Floyd decals and a premium stereo, and had Volkswagen's most environmentally friendly engine, at Gilmour's insistence. In 1995, Gilmour said he was uncomfortable with the sponsorship: "I don't want [Volkswagen] to be able to say they have a connection with Pink Floyd, that they're part of our success. We will not do it again." He said he had donated the money he made from the sponsorship to charity.

Sales 
At the end of the year, the Division Bell Tour was announced as the biggest tour ever, with worldwide gross of over £150 million (about US$250 million). In the U.S. alone, it grossed US$103.5 million from 59 concerts. However, this record was short-lived; less than a year later, the Rolling Stones' Voodoo Lounge Tour finished with a worldwide gross of over US$300 million. The Rolling Stones, AC/DC, Metallica, U2, the Police, Bon Jovi, Roger Waters and Madonna remain the only acts ever to achieve a higher worldwide gross from a tour, even when adjusting for inflation. The massive and innovative stage set for the tour was designed by Mark Fisher, who, with his Entertainment Architecture studio STUFISH went on to design many more of the record breaking stadium and arena tours for The Rolling Stones, Tina Turner, U2, Maddona and many others.

Personnel
Pink Floyd:
 David Gilmour – guitars, lead vocals, pedal steel guitar
 Nick Mason – drums, percussion 
 Richard Wright – keyboards, lead vocals on 'Astronomy Domine," "Time" and "Comfortably Numb", backing vocals

Additional musicians:
 Guy Pratt – bass, lead vocals on "Comfortably Numb" and "Run Like Hell", backing vocals
 Jon Carin – keyboards, lead vocals on "Comfortably Numb" and "Hey You", backing vocals
 Gary Wallis – percussion, additional drums
 Tim Renwick – guitars, backing vocals
 Dick Parry – saxophones
 Sam Brown – backing vocals, lead vocals on "The Great Gig in the Sky"
 Claudia Fontaine – backing vocals, lead vocals on "The Great Gig in the Sky"
 Durga McBroom – backing vocals, lead vocals on "The Great Gig in the Sky"

Set list
There were two typical set lists used throughout the tour. The first was used all tour, and the second was introduced on 15 July at the Pontiac Silverdome, and rotated with the first typical set list for the remainder of the tour.

Typical set list one:

First set:

 "Astronomy Domine" (in Europe would sometimes open the second set)
 "Learning to Fly"
 "What Do You Want from Me?"
 "On the Turning Away"
 "Take It Back"
 Song(s) from The Division Bell(Any one, or occasionally two, of "A Great Day for Freedom" [39x], "Poles Apart" [24x], "Coming Back to Life" [43x], and "Lost for Words" [8x])
 "Sorrow"
 "Keep Talking"
 "One of These Days"

Encore:

 "Hey You"
 "Run Like Hell"

Second set:

 "Shine On You Crazy Diamond, Parts I–V, VII" (in Europe would sometimes open the first set)
 "Speak to Me"
 "Breathe"
 "Time"
 "High Hopes"
 "The Great Gig in the Sky"
 "Wish You Were Here"
 "Us and Them"
 "Money"
 "Another Brick in the Wall, Part 2"
 "Comfortably Numb"

Typical set list two:

First set:

 "Shine On You Crazy Diamond, Parts I–V, VII"
 "Learning to Fly"
 "High Hopes" (replaced by "Wish You Were Here" for 4 September performance)
 "Take It Back" (replaced by "Lost for Words" for 19 October performance)
 "Coming Back to Life" (replaced by "A Great Day for Freedom" for 19 October performance and "Poles Apart" for 28 October performance)
 "Sorrow"
 "Keep Talking"
 "Another Brick in the Wall, Part 2"
 "One of These Days"

Encore:

 "Wish You Were Here" (replaced by "High Hopes" for 4 September performance)
 "Comfortably Numb"
 "Run Like Hell"

Second set:
''The Dark Side of the Moon
 "Speak to Me"
 "Breathe"
 "On the Run"
 "Time"
 "The Great Gig in the Sky"
 "Money"
 "Us and Them"
 "Any Colour You Like"
 "Brain Damage"
 "Eclipse"

Songs rarely played during this tour were:
"One Slip" (only played once on 22 April 1994 in Oakland, California between "The Great Gig in the Sky" and "Us and Them"; at this show, "Wish You Were Here" was played after "Us and Them")
"Marooned" (only played twice on 29 and 30 August 1994 in Oslo, Norway before "Run Like Hell")

Tour dates

Cancellations and rescheduled shows

See also
List of highest-grossing concert tours

References

External links
Pink Floyd Drums: The Division Bell Tour Drums

Pink Floyd concert tours
1994 concert tours